Glow Up: Britain's Next Make-Up Star (often shortened to Glow Up) is a British reality television competition devised to find new makeup artists. Originally hosted by Stacey Dooley, the first episode premiered on BBC Three on 6 March 2019. The contestants take part in weekly challenges to progress through the competition, which are judged by industry professionals Dominic Skinner and Val Garland, as well as weekly guest stars. After the conclusion of the first series, Glow Up was renewed for a second series, which premiered on BBC Three in May 2020. The third series began airing in April 2021, with Maya Jama replacing Dooley as the presenter. The fourth series began airing on 11 May 2022.

History
In January 2019, it was announced that English television personality Stacey Dooley would present Glow Up: Britain's Next Make-Up Star. On the series, Dooley commented: "I'm delighted to be involved with Glow Up. The make-up artists are so impressive and talented… and Val and Dominic were a scream to work with." Industry professionals Dominic Skinner and Val Garland were also announced as judges for the series. Dooley was criticised for her decision to partake in the programme, with her being accused of "selling out" and "ditching her investigative journalism roots". Dooley responded to the claims, saying: "It's painfully predictable: there are always people who are desperate to put you in your one camp and never let you leave. The idea that you could be interested in the Yazidi community and also in lipstick blows people's minds. It's a really short-sighted Stone Age attitude; it's boring, actually. I've earned my stripes; I don't need to prove myself to anyone. She added that: "We should celebrate make-up. It's a lucrative industry; a massive employer." Netflix acquired the rights to distribute Glow Up as a Netflix Original series in 2019.

In July 2019, Glow Up was renewed for a  second series. Dooley stated that she had fun filming the first series and expressed her excitement to be involved in the second series. Garland and Skinner echoed the comments, with Skinner adding that the MUAs need to raise the bar from what they had seen in the first series. The second series premiered on BBC Three on 14 May 2020.

In October 2020, Dooley announced that she would not be presenting the third series of Glow Up due to scheduling conflicts with her new series This Is My House. On 14 January 2021, it was announced that Glow Up had been renewed for a third series, set to air later that year. On the same day, it was announced that Dooley had been replaced by Maya Jama. On her decision to present Glow Up, Jama commented: "I absolutely love Glow Up and can't wait to join the family! I’m obsessed with makeup and creating different looks- it’s going to be so much fun and I can't wait to see what the MUAs get up to." Executive producer Melissa Brown stated that the series "will build on the massive success of series two with an incredible cast and exciting challenges, with access to the world's biggest film sets and brands." The third series began broadcasting on 20 April 2021.

The fourth series began airing on 11 May 2022 on BBC Three. The series consisted of 8 episodes, debuting for the first time as a weekly slot on BBC Three newly commissioned television channel launch. Previously, all series were directly streaming on BBC Iplayer.

Cast

Series overview

Format
In the professional assignment, the make-up artists (MUAs) are set a task by the judges, outside of the studio, to follow a brief for something. At the end the challenge, the judges choose one to three challenge winners who stay behind to help with more make up looks. At the end of the professional assignment, the judges will choose a provisional bottom two going into the creative brief. The two people in the "red chairs" are given a 15-minute penalty going into the creative brief. In the creative brief, the MUAs are given a description of the look required. The MUAs are typically given preparation time prior to the challenge. If an MUA in a red chair is successful in the challenge, they have 'Beat The Seat'. Therefore, an MUA who performed less successfully take their place in the Face Off. In the face off, two MUAs take part in a challenge; the challenge content normally focuses on one section of the face, such as recreating an eye look or applying the "perfect lip". The MUA who performs the worst is eliminated, and the other progresses onto the next episode.

Reception
After its premiere, Jazmin Kapotsha of Refinery29 described the programme as a mixture of America's Next Top Model, The Great British Bake Off and YouTube beauty tutorials. She added that the "craft is undeniably incredible" and that "it came as a huge surprise". Sara Wallis of the Daily Mirror wrote: "I'm fascinated by the astonishing makeup creations and lashings of high drama. It’s an angsty, youthful show that certainly glows."

References

External links
 
 

2010s British reality television series
2020s British reality television series
2019 British television series debuts
BBC reality television shows
English-language television shows
Stacey Dooley
Cosmetic industry
Television series by Warner Bros. Television Studios
Reality competition television series